Mesocerea apicalis is a moth of the subfamily Arctiinae. It is found in Suriname and French Guiana.

References

Moths described in 1911
Arctiinae